The 2004 Formula Renault 2000 Germany season was the thirteenth Formula Renault 2000 Germany season. The season began at Oschersleben on 8 May and finished on 9 October at the same venue, after fourteen races.

Motopark Oschersleben driver Scott Speed won four races on his way to championship title. His compatriot Colin Fleming of the Jenzer Motorsport won races at Salzburgring and Lausitz. Michael Ammermüller completed the top 3 without winning a race. The same number of wins as the champion had Pascal Kochem, who finished fourth. Other wins were shared between Frank Kechele, Reinhard Kofler and Pekka Saarinen, who finished sixth, seventh and eighth respectively.

Drivers and teams

Race calendar and results

Standings
Point system :  30, 24, 20, 17, 16, 15, 14, 13, 12, 11, 10, 9, 8, 7, 6, 5, 4, 3, 2, 1 for 20th. No points for Fastest lap or Pole position.

References

External links
 Official website of the Formula Renault 2.0 Germany championship

Germany
Formula Renault 2000 Germany
Formula Renault 2000 Germany